Clair Francis Bee (March 2, 1896 – May 20, 1983) was an American basketball coach who led the team at Long Island University in Brooklyn, New York to undefeated seasons in 1936 and 1939, as well as two National Invitation Tournament titles in 1939 and 1941.

Biography 
Bee was born in Grafton, West Virginia to James Edward Bee (1871–1933) and Margaret Ann Skinner. Later, Bee was a graduate of Waynesburg University (then Waynesburg College) where he played football, baseball, and tennis.

Bee's teams won 95 percent of their games from 1931 to 1951, including 43 in a row from 1935 to 1937. Bee holds the Division I NCAA record for highest winning percentage, winning 83% of the games he was head coach. Bee resigned in 1951 after several of his players were implicated in the CCNY Point Shaving Scandal. LIU shut down its athletic program shortly afterward.

Bee also coached the football team at LIU until it was disbanded in 1940.

He coached the National Basketball Association's Baltimore Bullets from 1952 to 1954, amassing a 34–116 record under his tenure.

Bee was known as the "Innovator". His contributions to the game of basketball include the 1–3–1 zone defense and the three-second rule. Bee also served as co-host of the early NBC sports-oriented television program "Campus Hoopla" on WNBT from 1946 to 1947.

His influence on the game also extended to strategies sports camps (Camp All-America), (Kutsher's Sports Academy), writing technical coaching books, and conducting coaching clinics around the world. By the time he left coaching in the 1950s, Bee had already begun writing the Chip Hilton Sports Series for younger readers.

Bee was inducted into the Basketball Hall of Fame in 1968. The Clair Bee Coach of the Year Award is awarded every year to a coach who makes an outstanding contribution to the game of college basketball, and the Chip Hilton Player of the Year Award is awarded to a men's basketball player.

In 1968, he cofounded the Kutsher's Sports Academy.

One of Bee's grandfathers was Ephraim Bee, a member of the first West Virginia Legislature.

Head coaching record

College

Football

Basketball

Baseball

Professional

NBA 

|-
| style="text-align:left;"|BAL
| style="text-align:left;"|
| 70||16||54||.229|| style="text-align:center;"|4th in Eastern||2||0||2||.000
| style="text-align:center;"|Lost in Div. Semifinals
|-
| style="text-align:left;"|BAL
| style="text-align:left;"|
| 72||16||56||.222|| style="text-align:center;"|5th in Eastern||—||—||—||—
| style="text-align:center;"|Missed Playoffs
|- class="sortbottom"
| style="text-align:left;"|Career
| ||142||32||110||.225|| ||2||0||2||.000||  |

References

External links
 

1896 births
1983 deaths
American men's basketball players
Baltimore Bullets (1944–1954) head coaches
Basketball coaches from West Virginia
Basketball players from West Virginia
LIU Brooklyn Blackbirds baseball coaches
LIU Brooklyn Blackbirds men's basketball coaches
Long Island Blackbirds football coaches
Naismith Memorial Basketball Hall of Fame inductees
National Collegiate Basketball Hall of Fame inductees
People from Grafton, West Virginia
Rider Broncs athletic directors
Rider Broncs baseball coaches
Rider Broncs men's basketball coaches
Rider Roughriders football coaches
Rider University faculty
Waynesburg Yellow Jackets baseball players
Waynesburg Yellow Jackets football players
Waynesburg Yellow Jackets men's tennis players

Writers from West Virginia